John Neville, 3rd Baron Neville,  (c.1337 – 17 October 1388) was an English peer, naval commander, and soldier.

Origins
He was born between 1337 and 1340 at Raby Castle, County Durham, the eldest son of Ralph Neville, 2nd Baron Neville de Raby by his wife Alice Audley, a daughter of Hugh de Audley of Stratton Audley in Oxfordshire and sister of Hugh de Audley, 1st Earl of Gloucester, 1st Baron Audley (c.1291-1347) of Stratton Audley. He had five brothers, including Alexander Neville, Archbishop of York, and four sisters.

Career
Cokayne notes that Neville's public career was as active as his father's had been. He fought against the Scots at the Battle of Neville's Cross on 17 October 1346 as a captain under his father, was knighted about 1360 after a skirmish near Paris while serving under Sir Walter Manny, and fought in Aquitaine in 1366, and again in 1373-4.

At his father's death on 5 August 1367, he succeeded to the title, and had livery of his lands in England and Scotland in October of that year.

From 1367, on he had numerous commissions issued to him, and in 1368 served as joint ambassador to France. He was made a Knight of the Garter in 1369. In July 1370, he was appointed Admiral of the North, and in November of that year a joint commissioner to treat with Genoa. He was Steward of the King's Household in 1372, and in July of that year was part of an expedition to Brittany. For the next several years he served in Scotland and the Scottish Marches. In 1378 he had licence to fortify Raby Castle, and in June of the same year was in Gascony, where he was appointed Keeper of Fronsac Castle and Lieutenant of Gascony. He spent several years in Gascony, and was among the forces which raised the siege of Mortaigne in 1381. On his return to England, he was again appointed Warden of the Marches. In May 1383 and March 1387, he was a joint commissioner to treat of peace with Scotland, and in July 1385 was to accompany the King to Scotland.

Neville died at Newcastle upon Tyne on 17 October 1388. In his will he requested burial in Durham Cathedral by his first wife, Maud. He was succeeded by his eldest son, Ralph Neville, 1st Earl of Westmorland.

Marriages and issue
Neville married twice:

Firstly, before 1362, to Maud Percy (d. before 18 February 1379), a daughter of Henry de Percy, 2nd Baron Percy of Alnwick, Northumberland, by his wife Idoine de Clifford, a daughter of Robert de Clifford, 1st Baron de Clifford. By Maud he had two sons and five daughters:
 Ralph Neville, 1st Earl of Westmorland (c.1364-1425), eldest son and heir.
 Thomas Neville, 5th Baron Furnivall, who married Joan Furnival
 Alice Neville, who married William Deincourt, 3rd Baron Deincourt.
 Maud Nevile.
 Idoine Neville.
 Eleanor Neville, who married Ralph de Lumley, 1st Baron Lumley.
 Elizabeth Neville, a nun.

Secondly, before 9 October 1381, he married Elizabeth Latimer (d. 5 November 1395), daughter and heiress of William Latimer, 4th Baron Latimer, who survived him and re-married (as his second wife) to Robert Willoughby, 4th Baron Willoughby de Eresby (c.1348-50 – 9 August 1396), by whom she had a daughter, Margaret Willoughby. Neville had by Elizabeth Latimer a further son and a daughter:
John Neville, 6th Baron Latimer (c.1382 – 10 December 1430), who married firstly, Maud Clifford (c.26 August 1446), daughter of Thomas de Clifford, 6th Baron de Clifford, whom he divorced before 1413/17, by whom he had no issue. She married secondly, Richard of Conisburgh, 3rd Earl of Cambridge.
Elizabeth Neville, who before 27 May 1396 married Sir Thomas Willoughby (died shortly before 20 August 1417) son of Robert Willoughby, 4th Baron Willoughby de Eresby (c.1348-50 – 9 August 1396), by whom she had one child, Sir John Willoughby (c.1400 – 24 February 1437).

See also
Baron Percy

Notes

External links
 Inquisition Post Mortem #725-750, dated 1388.

References

Further reading

Garter Knights appointed by Edward III
1337 births
1388 deaths
14th-century English nobility
14th-century English Navy personnel
People of the Wars of Scottish Independence
Barons Neville of Raby
John
English admirals